Claire is an electropop band from Munich, Germany.

History

In 2012, three musicians and producers Matthias Hauck, Heller Nepomuk and Florian Kiermaier found Josie-Claire Buerkle to sing for a film project with their shared recording studios. This was a result of her participation in the TV show The Voice of Germany the year before, and her subsequent search for a band. Out of their film project emerged the band. The fifth member of the band, drummer Fridolin Achten, joined shortly after.

They had immediate Internet success with their first volume, the EP Games, helping them to get a recording contract with Capitol Records, part of Universal Music Group. In the summer of 2013, they had an initial moderate success with the title song of their EP in the German charts. At the end of September they released their debut LP, entitled The Great Escape, which debuted at number 38 on the album charts.

Band members
 Josie-Claire Bürkle – vocals
 Matthias Hauck – keyboards
 Nepomuk Heller – keyboards
 Florian Kiermaier – guitar
 Fridolin Achten – drums

Discography

Studio albums

Extended plays

Singles
"Pioneers" (2012)
"Games" (2013)
"The Next Ones to Come" (2013)
"Overdrive" (2013)

References

External links

 Official website
 

2012 establishments in Germany
Musical groups established in 2012
German electronic music groups